Chabannes may refer to:

Places
Chabbanes, today part of Saint-Pierre-de-Fursac
Château de Chabannes, a castle in Saint-Pierre-de-Fursac
Chabannes, today part of Saint-Sulpice-le-Dunois
Chabannes, hamlet in Châteauneuf-Val-Saint-Donat

People
Adémar de Chabannes (d. 1034), French monk, composer and historian
Jacques de Chabannes (d. 1453), French military leader
Antoine de Chabannes (d. 1488), French military leader
Jean de Chabannes la Palice (d. 1933), French sailor